Tragidion is a genus of beetles in the family Cerambycidae, containing the following species:

 Tragidion agave Swift & Ray, 2008
 Tragidion annulatum LeConte, 1858
 Tragidion armatum LeConte, 1858
 Tragidion auripenne Casey, 1893
 Tragidion bicolor Bates, 1885
 Tragidion carinatum Thomson, 1860
 Tragidion coquus (Linnaeus, 1758)
 Tragidion deceptum Swift & Ray, 2008
 Tragidion densiventre Casey, 1912
 Tragidion dichromaticum Linsley, 1957
 Tragidion gracilipes Linsley, 1940

References

Trachyderini
Cerambycidae genera